Democracy Forward Foundation is a 501(c)(3) non-profit and non-partisan legal services and public policy research organization in Washington, D.C. Founded in 2017, the organization works to expose and litigate corruption in the Executive Branch of the United States government.

Democracy Forward does not disclose the source of its start-up or ongoing funding on its website.

Composed of litigators, researchers, and communications strategists, the organization brings legal action against the agencies and executives of the U.S. government on behalf of individuals, organizations, and municipalities in the United States.

Notable examples of the group's work include Canoe Cruisers Association v. United States Coast Guard, VoteVets v. Department of Veterans Affairs, and City of Columbus v. Trump.

References

Non-profit organizations based in Washington, D.C.
Government watchdog groups in the United States